Cymatura bifasciata is a species of beetle in the family Cerambycidae. It was described by Carl Eduard Adolph Gerstaecker in 1855. It is known from South Africa, Mozambique, Zambia, the Democratic Republic of the Congo, Eswatini, Malawi, and Zimbabwe. It feeds on Acacia decurrens.

Subspecies
 Cymatura bifasciata bifasciata Gerstaecker, 1855
 Cymatura bifasciata reducta Breuning, 1950

References

Xylorhizini
Beetles described in 1855